Chaartaar ( lit. Four Strings) is a Persian fusion band founded in 2011.

Members
 Arman Garshasbi, vocalist
 Arash Fathi - Composer 
 Ehsan Haeri - songwriter
 Aeen Ahmadifar - Arrangement

Style

The group’s style is a fusion of electronic music combined with Persian vocal music.

In September and October 2016 "Chaartaar" had their first live tour out of Iran, they started their tour from Vancouver in Canada and continued it in Calgary, Montreal and Toronto. After that they traveled to Europe and continue their tour in Rotterdam, Düsseldorf, London, Manchester, Gothenburg, Stockholm and Frankfurt.

Albums

Awards 
 Best Album of year (in fusion style): Baaraan Toee
 Best Track of year (in fusion style): Baaraan Toee
 Best-selling Album in beeptunes: Jaddeh Miraghsad
Barbad award for best pop music composition: Baaraan Toee

References

External links
Official website (in English & Persian)

Chaartaar Concert in Rotterdam (+Video)

Persian classical music groups

Barbad award winners